Montfortulana is a genus of sea snails, marine gastropod mollusks in the family Fissurellidae, the keyhole limpets and slit limpets.

Species
Species within the genus Montfortulana include:
Montfortulana eurythma (Dautzenberg, 1907)
Montfortulana sulcifera (Adams, 1852)

References

External links
 To ITIS
 To World Register of Marine Species

Fissurellidae